Shurik may refer to:
 Shurik, North Khorasan
 Shurik, Chaypareh, West Azerbaijan Province
 Shurik, Khoy, West Azerbaijan Province
 Shurik, Salmas, West Azerbaijan Province
 Shurik-e Abdabad

Fictional characters
 Shurik, the protagonist of a series of Russian films directed by Leonid Gaidai